Iranada is a genus of moths of the family Noctuidae. The genus was described by Wiltshire in 1977.

Iranada tarachoides (Bytinski-Salz & Brandt, 1937)
Iranada ornata (Brandt, 1939)
Iranada venusta (Brandt, 1939)
Iranada secunda (Ershov, 1874)
Iranada turcorum (Zerny, 1915)
Iranada versicolor (Brandt, 1939)

References

Calpinae